Gunnar Ólafsson (born 9 June 1993) is an Icelandic basketball player for Fryshuset Basket  in the Swedish Basketball League and the Icelandic men's national basketball team.

Playing career
After starting his career with Fjölnir, Gunnar moved to Keflavík in 2013. In September 2013, he helped Keflavík win the Icelandic Company Cup, defeating KR in the Cup finals. In January 2014, he was selected to the Icelandic All-Star game.

In 2014, he joined St. Francis College and played there for four years.

He returned to Keflavík in 2018 and averaged 14.1 points and 3.9 rebounds during the 2018–19 Úrvalsdeild karla season. After the season, he terminated his contract with Keflavík, siting his desire to play overseas.

On 9 August 2019, Gunnar signed with LEB Oro club Oviedo CB. Three months later, he was waived by the club after appearing in 8 games, including 3 starts, where he averaged 3.0 points per game.

On 4 December 2019, Gunnar signed with returned to the Úrvalsdeild karla and signed with Stjarnan. On 15 February 2020, Gunnar won the Icelandic Cup for the first time after Stjarnan's 75-89 win against Grindavík in the Cup finals.

On 19 March 2022, he won his second Icelandic Basketball Cup when Stjarnan defeated reigning national champions Þór Þorlákshöfn in the 2022 Cup Finals.

In August 2022, Gunnar signed with Swedish Basketball League club Fryshuset Basket.

National team career
Gunnar was first selected to the Icelandic men's national basketball team in 2017 and played with the team during the Games of the Small States of Europe in 2017 and 2019.

Personal life
Gunnar's uncle is former Icelandic national team player Falur Harðarson.

References

External links
 Profile at realgm.com
 Icelandic statistics at kki.is

1993 births
Living people
St. Francis College alumni
Gunnar Olafsson
Gunnar Olafsson
Gunnar Olafsson
Gunnar Olafsson
Gunnar Olafsson
Gunnar Olafsson
Oviedo CB players
Stjarnan men's basketball players
Guards (basketball)